Frederick John Dealtry Lugard, 1st Baron Lugard  (22 January 1858 – 11 April 1945), known as Sir Frederick Lugard between 1901 and 1928, was a British soldier, mercenary, explorer of Africa and a colonial administrator. He was Governor of Hong Kong (1907–1912), the last Governor of Southern Nigeria Protectorate (1912–1914), the first High Commissioner (1900–1906) and last Governor (1912–1914) of Northern Nigeria Protectorate and the first Governor-General of Nigeria (1914–1919).

Early life and education
Lugard was born in Madras (now Chennai) in India, but was brought up in Worcester, England. He was the son of the Reverend Frederick Grueber Lugard, a British Army chaplain at Madras, and his third wife Mary Howard (1819–1865), the youngest daughter of Reverend John Garton Howard (1786–1862), a younger son of landed gentry from Thorne and Melbourne near York. His paternal uncle was Sir Edward Lugard, Adjutant-General in India from 1857 to 1858 and Permanent Under-Secretary of State for War at the War Office from 1861 to 1871. Lugard was educated at Rossall School and the Royal Military College, Sandhurst. The name 'Dealtry' was in honour of Thomas Dealtry, a friend of his father.

Military career

Lugard was commissioned into the 9th Foot (East Norfolk Regiment) in 1878 and joined the second battalion in India; he served in the Second Anglo-Afghan War (1878–1880), the Sudan campaign (1884–1885) and the Third Anglo-Burmese War (November 1885) and was awarded the Distinguished Service Order in 1887. After this promising start, his career was derailed when he fell in love with a twice married British divorcee he met in India; learning she had been injured in an accident, he abandoned his post in Burma to join her in Lucknow, then followed her to England. When she rejected him, Lugard decided to make a fresh start in Africa.

Karonga War
Around 1880, a group of Swahili traders under Mlozi bin Kazbadema established trading bases in the north-west sector of Lake Malawi, including a stockade at Chilumba on the lake from where ivory and slaves could be shipped across the lake. In 1883 the African Lakes Company set up a base in Karonga to exchange ivory for trade goods from these Swahili merchants.

Relations between the two groups deteriorated, partly because of the company's delays or unwillingness to provide guns, ammunition and other trade goods, and also because the Swahili traders turned more to slaving, attacking communities that the company had promised to protect, and hostilities broke out in mid-1887. The series of intermittent armed clashes that took place up to mid-1889 is known as the Karonga War, or sometimes the Arab War.

The African Lakes Company depot at Karonga was evacuated at the end of the year but in May 1888, Captain Lugard, persuaded by the British Consul at Mozambique, arrived to lead an expedition against Mlozi, sponsored by the African Lakes Company but without official support from the British government.

Lugard's first expedition of May to June 1888 attacked the Swahili stockades with limited success and, in the course of one attack, Lugard was wounded and withdrew south. Lugard's second expedition in December 1888 to March 1889 was larger and included a 7-pounder gun, which, however, failed to breach the stockade walls. Following this second failure, Lugard left the Lake Malawi region for Britain in April 1889.

Exploration of East Africa

After leaving Nyasaland in April 1889, Lugard accepted a position with the Imperial British East Africa Company (IBEAC) and arrived in Mombasa on the coast of east Africa that December. A year earlier in 1888, the IBEAC had been granted a royal charter by Queen Victoria to colonise the 'British sphere of influence' between Zanzibar and Uganda and were keen to open a trading route between Lake Victoria in Uganda and the coastal port of Mombasa. Their first interior trading post was established at Machakos 240 miles in from the coast. But the established traditional route to Machakos was a treacherous journey through the large Taru Desert —93 miles of scorching dust bowl.

Lugard's first mission was to determine the feasibility of a route from Mombasa to Machakos that would bypass the Taru Desert. He explored the Sabaki River and the neighbouring region, in addition to elaborating a scheme for the emancipation of the slaves held by Arabs in the Zanzibar mainland.

On 6 August 1890, Lugard began his caravan expedition to Uganda, accompanied by five other Europeans - George Wilson, Fenwick De Winton (son of Francis de Winton - Lugard's other chief), William Grant and Archibald Brown.

Departing from Mombasa towards Uganda to secure British predominance over German influence in the area and put an end to the civil disturbances between factions in the kingdom of Buganda.

En route, Lugard was instructed to enter into treaties with local tribes and build forts in order to secure safe passage for future IBEAC expeditions. The IBEAC employed official treaty documents that were signed by their administrator and the local leaders but Lugard preferred the more equitable blood brotherhood ceremony and entered into several brotherhood partnerships with leaders who inhabited the areas between Mombasa and Uganda. One of his famed blood partnerships was sealed in October 1890 during his journey to Uganda when he stopped at Dagoretti in Kikuyu territory and entered into an alliance with Waiyaki Wa Hinga.

Lugard was Military Administrator of Uganda from 26 December 1890 to May 1892. While administering Uganda, he journeyed round the Rwenzori Mountains to Lake Edward, mapping a large area of the country. He also visited Lake Albert and brought away some thousands of Sudanese who had been left there by Emin Pasha and H. M. Stanley during the Emin Pasha Relief Expedition.

When Lugard returned to England in 1892, he successfully dissuaded Prime Minister William Gladstone from allowing the IBEAC to abandon Uganda.

Early colonial service

In 1894, Lugard was dispatched by the Royal Niger Company to Borgu, where he secured treaties with the kings and chiefs who acknowledged the sovereignty of the British company, while reducing the influence of other colonial powers. From 1896 to 1897, Lugard took charge of an expedition to Lake Ngami, in modern-day Botswana, on behalf of the British West Charterland Company. He was recalled from Ngami by the British government and sent to West Africa, where he was commissioned to raise a native force to protect British interests in the hinterland of the Lagos Colony and Nigeria against French aggression. In August 1897, Lugard organised the West African Frontier Force and commanded it until the end of December 1899, when the disputes with France were settled.

After relinquishing command of the West African Frontier Force, Lugard was appointed High Commissioner of the newly created Protectorate of Northern Nigeria. He was present at Mount Patti, Lokoja and read the proclamation that established the protectorate on 1 January 1900. At that time, the portion of Northern Nigeria under effective control was small, and Lugard's task in organising this vast territory was made more difficult by the refusal of the sultan of Sokoto and many other Fula princes to fulfill their treaty obligations.

In 1903, British control over the whole protectorate was made possible by a successful campaign against the emir of Kano and the sultan of Sokoto. By the time Lugard resigned as commissioner in 1906, the entire region of what would eventually be transformed into modern-day Nigeria was being peacefully administered under the supervision of British residents.

Lugard was knighted in the 1901 New Year Honours for his service in Nigeria.

Lugard restored peace and order, and suppressed Fulani despotism. He also stopped slave raiding and abolished  slavery and the slave trade. He began developing the country by getting it surveyed, mapped, and improved transport and communications. He also re-organised the taxation system. Lugard is most importantly remembered for his political system of rule which was practised in Nigeria, called indirect rule, particularly in Igboland.

Governor of Hong Kong

About a year after he resigned as High Commissioner of the Protectorate of Northern Nigeria, Lugard was appointed Governor of Hong Kong, a position he held until March 1912. During his tenure, Lugard proposed to return Weihaiwei to the Chinese government, in return for the ceding of the rented New Territories in perpetuity. However, the proposal was neither well received nor acted upon. Some believed that if the proposal were carried through, Hong Kong might forever remain in British hands.

Lugard's chief interest was education and he was largely remembered for his efforts to the founding of the University of Hong Kong in 1911. He became the first chancellor, despite a cold reception from the Colonial Office and local British companies, such as the Hongkong and Shanghai Banking Corporation. The Colonial Office called the idea of a university "Sir Frederick's pet lamb". Lugard's chief impetus from founding the university was to have it serve as a bearer of Western culture in East Asia. He expected the university, however, to adopt a politically conservative framework supportive of the colonial authorities and refrain from teaching ideas such as democracy or equality. He was financially backed by his personal friend Sir Horsusjee Naorojee Mody who shared the same vision for the establishment of a university in Hong Kong.

Governor of Nigeria

In 1912, Lugard returned to Nigeria as Governor of the two protectorates. His mission was to combine the two colonies into one. Although controversial in Lagos, where it was opposed by a large section of the political class and the media, the amalgamation did not arouse passion in the rest of the country because the people were unaware of the implications. Lugard took scant notice of public opinion, neither did he feel there was need for consensus among the locals on such a serious political subject which had such key implications for the two colonies. From 1914 to 1919, Lugard served as Governor General of the now combined colony of Nigeria. Throughout his tenure, he sought strenuously to secure the amelioration of the condition of the native people, among other means by the exclusion, wherever possible, of alcoholic liquors, and by the suppression of slave raiding and slavery.

Lugard, assisted by his indefatigable wife, Flora Shaw, concocted a legend which warped understanding of him, Nigeria and colonial rule for decades. He believed that "the typical African ... is a happy, thriftless, excitable person, lacking in self control, discipline and foresight, naturally courageous, courteous and polite, full of personal vanity, with little of veracity; in brief, the virtues and defects of this race-type are those of attractive children."

Funding of the colony of Nigeria in the development of state's infrastructure such as harbours, railways and hospitals in Southern Nigeria came from revenue generated by taxes on imported alcohol. In Northern Nigeria, the revenue that allowed state development projects was less because the taxes was absent and thus funding of projects was covered from revenue generated in the south.

The Adubi War occurred during his governorship. In Northern Nigeria, Lugard permitted slavery within traditional native elite families. He loathed the educated and sophisticated Africans living in the coastal regions. Lugard ran the country whilst spending half each year in England, where he could promote himself and was distant from realities in Africa, where subordinates had to delay decisions on many matters until he returned. He based his rule on a military system—unlike William MacGregor, a doctor turned governor, who mixed with all ranks of people and listened to what was wanted. The Lugard who opposed "native education" later became involved in Hong Kong University, and the man who disliked traders and businessmen became a director of a Nigerian bank.

When the British Government decided to raise a local militia to protect the western frontier of the Royal Niger Company's territory against French advance from Dahomey, Lugard was sent and he successfully organised the West African Frontier Force, which he used successfully to defend not only the western but the northern frontiers of Nigeria from French encroachment. This saved Nigeria from the assimilation issues of the French.

Lugard's greatest contribution to the making of Modern Nigeria was the successful amalgamation of the North and South in 1914. Even after the amalgamation, the two parts remained as two separate countries with separate administrations. "Though in doing this, he aimed primarily at making the wealth and seaport facilities of the South available to the North, he had in fact fashioned the political unity of the Giant of Africa. " As noted earlier, amalgamation of Nigeria helped in making Nigeria to have common telegraphs, railways, customs and excise, a Supreme Court, a standard time, a common currency, and a common civil service, he introduced all the necessities needed for infrastructure in a modern state.

More importantly, he laid the foundations of continuous legislative assemblies in Nigeria by establishing the Nigerian council in 1914. It consisted of the Governor, Chief Secretary and a few nominated members who met to listen to government policies and give their advice. Unfortunately, it legislated only for the South. It could be referred to as a mock parliament because it set pace for the Legislative Council of later years.

In spite of his contributions, Lugard's work was not without faults. "He aimed at creating in Nigeria one administrative unit but he did not intend to create a Nigerian nation". Instead, his policy of isolating the North from the South, a policy which his successors maintained had a hand in the present disunity of Nigeria till today. An example is the exclusion of the North from the Legislative Council until 1947. "Thus, it can be said that Lugard sowed the seeds of separatist tendency which has still plagued Nigerian unity".
Lugard was also partly responsible for the backwardness in the education and other social services of the Northerners And this is the reason for the South's advance in education over the North.
To sum it up, Lugard's attitude to Nigeria implied that he did not envisage self-government for Nigeria. He planned for perpetual British colonialism. "His system of Indirect Rule, his hostility towards educated Nigerians in the South, and his system of education for the North which aimed at training only the sons of the chiefs and emirs as clerks and interpreters show him as one of Britain's arch-imperialists", says K. B. C. Onwubiko.

The Dual Mandate in British Tropical Africa
Lugard's The Dual Mandate in British Tropical Africa was published in 1922 and discussed indirect rule in colonial Africa. He argued that administration of Africa could simultaneously promote the well-being of the inhabitants and develop the resources of the continent for the benefit of mankind. According to Lugard, there were three principles of colonial administration: decentralization (granting power to local district officers in colonies), continuity (extensive record-keeping so that successors would build upon the policies of predecessors), and cooperation (building local support for the colonial government). He defended British colonial practices, in particular the system of indirect rule that he introduced in Nigeria.

In this work, Lugard outlined the reasons and methods that he recommended for the colonisation of Africa. Some of his justifications for establishing colonial rule included spreading Christianity and ending barbaric practises by African such as human sacrifice. He also saw state-sponsored colonisation as a way to protect missionaries, local chiefs and local people from each other, as well as from foreign powers. For Lugard, it was also vital that Britain gain control of unclaimed areas before Germany, Portugal or France claimed the land and its resources for themselves. He realised that there were vast profits to be made through the export of resources such as rubber, and through taxation of native populations as well as importers and exporters (the British taxpayer continually made a loss from the colonies in this period). In addition, these resources and inexpensive native labour (slavery having been abolished by Britain in 1833) would provide vital fuel for the industrial revolution in resource-depleted Britain, as well as monies for public works projects. Finally, Lugard reasoned that colonisation had become a fad and that, in order to remain a global power, Britain would need to hold colonies to avoid appearing weak.

William Rappard was influenced by Lugard's book. He sought to get Lugard appointed to the Permanent Mandates Commission of the League of Nations.

League of Nations and Abolitionist activism

Between 1922 and 1936, Lugard was the British representative on the League of Nations' Permanent Mandates Commission. Lugard saw imperial administration in moral terms and advocated for humane principles of colonial rule. He saw the role of the Permanent Mandates Commission as involving standard-setting and oversight, whereas actual administration should be left to national powers.

Lugard supported General George Spafford Richardson's repressive rule of Western Samoa. Lugard criticized European settlers and Samoans who engaged in "interracial mobilization." Lugard played a key role in drafting a Commission report that exonerated Richardson's governance of Western Samoa and placed the blame of the Western Samoa unrest on the anti-colonial activist Olaf Frederick Nelson.

During this period he served first on the Temporary Slavery Commission and was involved in organising the 1926 Slavery Convention. He had submitted a proposal for the convention to the British government. Although they were initially alarmed by it, the British government backed the proposal (after subjecting it to considerable redrafting) and it was eventually enacted. Lugard served on the International Labour Organization's Committee of Experts on Native Labour from 1925 to 1941.

Views

Lugard pushed for native rule in African colonies. He reasoned that black Africans were very different from white Europeans, although he did speculate on the admixture of Aryan or Hamitic blood arising from the advent of Islam among the Hausa and Fulani. He considered that natives should act as a sort of middle manager in colonial governance. This would avoid revolt because, he believed, the people of Africa would be more likely to follow someone who looked like them, spoke their languages and shared their customs.

Olúfẹmi Táíwò argues that Lugard blocked Africans who had been educated in Europe from playing an active role in the development of Colonial Nigeria; he distrusted white "intellectuals" as much as black ones, believing that the principles they were taught in the universities were often wrong. Lugard preferred to advance prominent Hausa and Fulani leaders from traditional structures.

Lugard was an advocate for European paternalist governance over Africans. He described Africans as holding "the position of a late-born child in the family of nations, and must as yet be schooled in the discipline of the nursery."

Honours

Lugard was appointed a Companion of the Order of the Bath (CB) in 1895. He was knighted as a Knight Commander of the Order of St Michael and St George (KCMG) in the 1901 New Year Honours and raised to a Knight Grand Cross (GCMG) in 1911. He was appointed to the Privy Council in the 1920 New Year Honours. In 1928 he was further honoured when he was elevated to the peerage as Baron Lugard, of Abinger in the County of Surrey.

The Royal Geographical Society awarded him the Founder's Medal in 1902 for persistent attention to African geography.

A bronze bust of Lugard, created by Pilkington Jackson in 1960, is held in the National Portrait Gallery, London.

Personal life

Lugard married, on 10 June 1902, Flora Shaw, daughter of Major-General George Shaw, and granddaughter of Sir Frederick Shaw, 3rd Baronet. She was a foreign correspondent for The Times and coined the place name Nigeria. There were no children from the marriage. She died in January 1929; Lugard survived her by sixteen years and died on 11 April 1945, aged 87. Since he was childless, the barony became extinct. He was cremated at Woking Crematorium.

Published works

In 1893, Lugard published The Rise of our East African Empire, which was partially an autobiography. He was also the author of various valuable reports on Northern Nigeria issued by the Colonial Office.
The Dual Mandate in British Tropical Africa, 1922.

See also

 Indirect rule 
 Richmond Palmer
 Frank Lugard Brayne
 George Wilson (Chief Colonial Secretary of Uganda)

References

 
 Biography, Oxford Dictionary of National Biography

Further reading 

 
 
 
 Meyer, Karl E. and Shareen Blair Brysac. Kingmakers: The Invention of the Modern Middle East (2009) pp 59–93.

External links 

Archives Hub:Papers of Frederick Dealtry Lugard, Baron Lugard of Abinger: 1871–1969
 

1858 births
1945 deaths
Military personnel from Worcester, England
People educated at Rossall School
Graduates of the Royal Military College, Sandhurst
Royal Norfolk Regiment officers
Royal West African Frontier Force officers
British military personnel of the Second Anglo-Afghan War
British Army personnel of the Mahdist War
British military personnel of the Third Anglo-Burmese War
Lugard, Frederick Lugard, 1st Baron
English explorers
Companions of the Distinguished Service Order
Explorers of Africa
Governors of Hong Kong
British Governors and Governors-General of Nigeria
Knights Grand Cross of the Order of St Michael and St George
Companions of the Order of the Bath
Members of the Privy Council of the United Kingdom
Vice-Chancellors of the University of Hong Kong
Nigeria in World War I
British expatriates in Hong Kong
History of Lagos
Military personnel of British India
20th-century Hong Kong people
20th-century British politicians
Barons created by George V